Rev. Archibald "Archie" Eneas Robertson  (1870–1958), was a Church of Scotland minister.

Life
He was born in Helensburgh on 3 July 1870, the son of a prosperous merchant then educated at Glasgow Academy. He then studied divinity at Glasgow University, graduating MA in 1892 and BD in 1896.

From 1897 to 1906 he assisted in churches in Edinburgh and Musselburgh.

In 1907 Robertson became minister of Braes of Rannoch (near the Bridge of Gaur, on the River Gaur) where he made an effort to learn Scottish Gaelic, to deliver his sermons in Gaelic and try to keep the language alive.

In 1918 he moved to Edinburgh as chaplain of Astley Ainslie Hospital. In 1946 he was elected a fellow of the Royal Society of Edinburgh. His proposers were John (Ian) Bartholomew, Murray Macgregor, James Ernest Richey, Thomas Cooper, 1st Baron Cooper of Culross, Douglas Guthrie and James Ritchie.

He was president of the Scottish Mountaineering Club 1930–32. In 1946 he became the first president of the Scottish Rights of Way Society.

He died at home in Edinburgh on 22 June 1958.

Climbing reputation
He climbed his first Munro in 1889. He joined the Scottish Mountaineering Club in 1893.

Doubts have been expressed about whether he climbed Ben Wyvis, and he did not climb the Inaccessible Pinnacle. He admitted turning back on Ben Wyvis because of adverse weather, and it is not known whether he climbed it again. The Inaccessible Pinnacle was not classified as a Munro in 1901, only its parent peak Sgurr Dearg, which is slightly lower.

Robertson's final Munro was Meall Dearg on Aonach Eagach in Glen Coe. On reaching the summit, he famously kissed the cairn and then his wife.

Family
He married twice: first to Katherine Clayson McFarlane, then, following her death in 1935, he married Winifred Dorothy Hutchison.

References

20th-century Ministers of the Church of Scotland
Scottish mountain climbers
1870 births
1958 deaths
People from Helensburgh
Fellows of the Royal Scottish Geographical Society